Nikola Lakčević may refer to:
 Nikola Lakčević (volleyball)
 Nikola Lakčević (footballer)